Collonges is the name of several places:

France

Collonges is the name or part of the name of several communes in France:

 Collonges, in the Ain département
 Collonges-au-Mont-d'Or, in the Rhône département
 Collonges-la-Rouge, in the Corrèze département
 Collonges-lès-Bévy, in the Côte-d'Or département
 Collonges-lès-Premières, in the Côte-d'Or département
 Collonges-sous-Salève, in the Haute-Savoie département

Switzerland

 Collonges, in the canton of Valais

See also
 Collonge (disambiguation)